Kentucky Route 3716 (KY 3716) is a  state secondary highway in central Kenton County. The highway extends from KY 1501 in Covington north to KY 16 in Taylor Mill. KY 3716 was established in 2015, extended west in 2018, and was extended again in December 2022 after the reroute of KY 1501.

Route description
KY 3716 begins at an intersection with KY 1501 (Hands Pike) in the far southern part of the city of Covington. The highway heads east along two-lane Wayman Branch Road, which parallels the eponymous creek to the boundary between Covington and the city of Taylor Mill. KY 3716 continues to the route's four-legged intersection with KY 16. KY 16 heads south on Taylor Mill Road and north on Pride Parkway; KY 3716 continues east on Taylor Mill Road. The highway follows a crescent-shaped path through Taylor Mill to its northern terminus at KY 16 at the northern end of Pride Parkway and the southern end of another KY 16 segment of Taylor Mill Road just south of KY 16's partial cloverleaf interchange with Interstate 275.
The Kentucky Transportation Cabinet includes the entire length of KY 3716 in the state secondary highway system.

History
After construction finished on KY 16's bypass of Taylor Mill, Pride Parkway, the Kentucky Transportation Cabinet accepted the new road as part of KY 16 and established KY 3716 along the bypassed part of KY 16 through a September 1, 2015, official order. The agency brought Wayman Branch Road into the state primary road system as an extension of KY 3716 through a September 20, 2018, official order. KY 3716 is expected to be extended west from the highway's terminus at KY 1501 along the latter highway to KY 17 (Madison Pike) after KY 1501 is realigned to a new intersection with KY 17. The KY 1501 realignment and a drainage and resurfacing project on the Wayman Branch Road portion of KY 3716 are expected to be completed by July 2023.

Major intersections

References

3716
Transportation in Kenton County, Kentucky